Dorangla is a town in the Gurdaspur district, Punjab state of India, near the border with Pakistan. It is about 15 km west from the district Gurdasur. The name dorngla is given to the town on the name of a Muslim leader Daurang Khan in the mugal era.

The town was developed during the empire of Emprur Akbar by Dorang Khan. Before partition with Pakistan this town has a great history of merchandise.

Cities and towns in Gurdaspur district